Dannebrog Island is an uninhabited island of the King Christian IX Land coast, Sermersooq municipality, southern Greenland. 

The island was named by officer of the Danish Navy Wilhelm August Graah and it was the northernmost point he reached during his 1828-1830 expedition along the southeast coast of Greenland.

Geography
Dannebrog Island is located on the southern side of the entrance of the Ikertivaq, a bay north of the Pikiulleq Bay. Suunikajik Island lies 18 km to the NE, at the other side of the sound.

It is separated from the mainland in the north by the Timmiarmiit Tunorqútariât, a narrow sound. Dannebrog is the largest island of the Graah Archipelago. Off its southern shoreline lies the island of Ittit and off the western end the mainland and the island of Simîtakajâ.

The island's coastline is irregular with bays in the north and the west, as well as an inlet on its eastern side between two peninsulas. There is a cairn standing at a height of 217 m on the northern peninsula of the eastern side of Dannebrog Island.

See also
List of islands of Greenland
Cartographic expeditions to Greenland

Bibliography

References

Uninhabited islands of Greenland